Cicero is a station on the Chicago Transit Authority's 'L' system, serving the Green Line. It opened on March 3, 1894, and serves the Austin neighborhood on Chicago's West side. The station is 24 blocks east and 2 blocks north of Harlem.

Bus connections 
CTA
  54 Cicero 

Pace
  392 Green Line Cicero CTA/UPS Hodgkins (Weekday UPS shifts only)

Notes and references

Notes

References

External links
 Cicero (Lake Street Line) Station Page
Cicero Avenue entrance from Google Maps Street View
Kilpatrick Avenue closed entrance from Google Maps Street View

CTA Green Line stations
Railway stations in the United States opened in 1894